Cecharismena is a genus of moths of the family Erebidae. The genus was erected by Möschler in 1890.

Taxonomy
The genus has previously been classified in the subfamily Phytometrinae within Erebidae or in the subfamily Calpinae of the family Noctuidae.

Species
 Cecharismena abarusalis Walker, 1859
 Cecharismena anartoides (Walker, 1865)
 Cecharismena cara Möschler, 1890
 Cecharismena jalapena (Schaus, 1906)
 Cecharismena nectarea Möschler, 1890

References

Boletobiinae
Noctuoidea genera